The Journey is a 1995 Iranian film directed by Alireza Raisian and written by Abbas Kiarostami. The film follows Farhad Sadri and his family, as their home in Tehran is bombed during the Gulf War. The family moves to northern Iran, and during their travels they experience special moments.

Cast 
 Dariush Farhang as Farhad Sadri
 Fatemeh Motamed-Arya as Pari
 Farrokhlagha Houshmand as Bibi
 Amir Pievar as grandfather Sadri
 Taymaz Saba as Arash Sadri

See also
List of Iranian films

References

External links

1995 films
1990s Persian-language films
1990s war drama films
Iranian war drama films
Films set in Iran
1995 drama films